The voiced uvular affricate is a rare type of consonantal sound, used in some spoken languages. The tie bar may be omitted, yielding .

Features
Features of the voiced uvular affricate:

Occurrence

Uvular

See also
 Index of phonetics articles

References

Uvular consonants
Voiced oral consonants
Central consonants
Pulmonic consonants